The men's K-2 1000 metres sprint canoeing competition at the 2010 Asian Games in Guangzhou was held from 22 to 25 November at the International Rowing Centre.

Schedule
All times are China Standard Time (UTC+08:00)

Results 
Legend
DNF — Did not finish

Heats 
 Qualification: 1–3 → Final (QF), Rest → Semifinal (QS)

Heat 1

Heat 2

Semifinal 
 Qualification: 1–3 → Final (QF)

Final

References 

Official Website

External links 
Asian Canoe Confederation

Canoeing at the 2010 Asian Games